The Chairman Joint Chiefs of Staff Committee (CJCSC) is, in principle, the highest-ranking and senior most uniformed military officer, typically at four-star rank, in the Pakistan Armed Forces who serves as a Principal Staff Officer and a chief military adviser to the civilian government led by elected Prime minister of Pakistan and his/her National Security Council. The role of advisement is also extended to the elected members in the bicameral Parliament and the Ministry of Defence. The Chairman leads the meetings and coordinates the combined efforts of the Joint Chiefs of Staff Committee (JCSC), comprising the Chairman, the Chief of Army Staff and Chief of Air Staff and the Chief of Naval Staff, Commandant of Marines, DG Coast Guards and Strategic Plans Division, and commanders of the service branches in the Civil Armed Forces and the National Guard.

Even as the Principal Staff Officer (PSO), the Chairman does not have any authority over the command of the combatant forces. The individual service chiefs are solely responsible for the coordination and logistics of the armed and combatant forces. Due to this constraint, the chiefs of army, navy and air force are much in command and control of their respected commands.

The Chairman's mandate is to transmit strategic communications to the combatant commanders from the Prime minister and President as well as allocate additional funding to the combatant commanders if necessary.  The Chairman is nominated and appointed by the Prime Minister; and is finally confirmed by the President.  Unlike United States's Chairman of the Joint Chiefs of Staff, the appointment of Chairman does not need confirmation via majority vote by the Parliament. Although, the appointment needs confirmation from the Prime minister. By statute, the Chairman is appointed as a four-star general, four-star air chief marshal and/or four star admiral. By law required, all four-star officers are required to have vast experience in joint uniformed services of Pakistan during their 40-year-long military careers.

The post of CJCSC was created by former Prime minister of Pakistan Zulfikar Ali Bhutto in March 1976, and the first Chairman was four star rank officer, General Muhammad Shariff. The current holder of the office is General Sahir Shamshad Mirza appointed in 2022.

Appointment preferences

Despite the post of the chairmanship is bound constitutionally for the rotation, the army generals are strongly preferred for such post, despite coming short of their qualifications, by the civilian prime ministers in a view of stabilizing the civil military relations.

Unlike the American system where the balance is made between the branches of the U.S. military, the majority of the chairmen are appointed from the department of the army, superseding the officers in the navy, marines, and the air force.

In 1999, Prime Minister Sharif notably refused to appoint the senior most officer, Admiral Fasih Bokhari, to such post in favor of appointing junior-most officer, Gen. Pervez Musharraf. This action of Prime Minister Sharif led towards Adm. Bokhar revolting against this decision in public in 1999, creating strain in the relation between the civilian government and the military.

The four-star admirals in the Pakistan Navy have been notably superseded by the junior army officers, in instances took place in 2005 when Adm. Karim was superseded by junior-most Lt-Gen. Ehsan ul Haq and, in 2011 when Adm. Numan was bypassed in favor of Lt-Gen. Wynne. In 2014, the practice continued by the civil government when Adm. Asif Sandila was bypassed and overlooked when the junior most officer, Lt-Gen. Rashad Mahmood was eventually appointed as Chairman joint chiefs.

Due to such preferential treatments given to army department, the retired admirals have given a strong criticism of such criterion, expressing their dissatisfaction towards the appointment processes.

List of Chairman Joint Chiefs of Staff Committee

Chairman of the Joint Chiefs of Staff by Branch of Service

Army - 14
Navy - 2
Air Force - 1

See also
Joint Chiefs of Staff Committee
Chief of Army Staff (Pakistan)
Grade 22
Chief of Air Staff (Pakistan)
Chief of Naval Staff (Pakistan)
Chief of General Staff (Pakistan)
Pakistan Army
Pakistan Air Force
Pakistan Navy

Notes

References

External links
Inter-Services Public Relations

Military of Pakistan
 C
Pakistan
Pakistani military appointments
Pakistani military leaders